The year 1938 in architecture involved some significant events.

Events
 First woman elected to Royal Institute of British Architects, Josephine Miller.

Buildings and structures

Buildings opened
 July – Saltdean Lido and Ocean Hotel, Saltdean, East Sussex, England, both designed by R.W.H. Jones.
 October 22 – Oxford Playhouse, Oxford, England, designed by Edward Maufe.
 October 29 – City Hall, Norwich, England, designed by C. H. James and S. R. Pierce.
 November 14 – Lions Gate Bridge in Vancouver, British Columbia, Canada.

Buildings completed

 The Reich Chancellery in Berlin, designed by Albert Speer (rebuilt).
 Great Mosque of Asmara in Italian Eritrea, designed by Guido Ferrazza.
 Church of the Epiphany, Gipton, Leeds, England, designed by Nugent Cachemaille-Day.
 Metro Theatre (Toronto), designed by Kaplan and Sprachman.
 Finsbury Health Centre, London, designed by Berthold Lubetkin and the Tecton Group.
 Metropolitan Water Board Laboratories, London, designed by Howard Robertson.
 Palace of Fine and Decorative Arts, Treasure Island, San Francisco Bay, California, USA, designed by George W. Kelham and William Peyton Day.
 Palace of Justice, Lima, Peru.
 City Hall, Mar del Plata, Argentina, designed by Alejandro Bustillo.
 Manchester Town Hall Extension, England, designed by Vincent Harris in 1927.
 São Bento Palace, Lisbon, Portugal.
 Kröller-Müller Museum, Otterlo, Netherlands, designed by Henry van de Velde.
 Helsinki Olympic Stadium, Finland, designed by Yrjö Lindegren and Toivo Jäntti.
 Brackenfell (house), Brampton, Carlisle, England, designed by Leslie Martin and Sadie Speight.
 The Homewood (house) near Esher, Surrey, England, designed by Patrick Gwynne (for his parents).
 Charters House, Berkshire, England, designed by Adie, Button and Partners.
 Hamstone House, St George's Hill, Weybridge, Surrey, designed by Ian Forbes.
 Middleton Park, Oxfordshire, England, the last great country house designed by Edwin Lutyens (with his son Robert).
 Houses in Hampshire, Sussex and at Eton, Berkshire in England by Marcel Breuer and F. R. S. Yorke.
 Gropius House, Lincoln, Massachusetts, designed by Walter Gropius with Marcel Breuer.
 Belvedere Court (apartments) in East Finchley, London, designed by Ernst L. Freud.
 Josephine M. Hagerty House, Cohasset, Massachusetts, designed by Walter Gropius with Marcel Breuer.
 Luma Tower, built as British Luma Co-Operative Electric Lamp factory, Glasgow, designed by Cornelius Armour.
 Fiat Tagliero Building, Asmara, Italian Eritrea, designed by Giuseppe Pettazzi.

Other
 Construction work begins on
 Mark Keppel High School in Alhambra, California, designed by Marston & Maybury.
 Council House, Bristol, England, designed by Vincent Harris.

Publications
 Lewis Mumford – The Culture of Cities

Awards
 AIA Gold Medal – Paul Philippe Cret
 RIBA Royal Gold Medal – Ivar Tengbom
 Grand Prix de Rome, architecture: Henry Bernard

Births
 April 16 – Wolf Hilbertz, German-born futurist architect, inventor and marine scientist (died 2007)
 May 12 – Terry Farrell, English architect, designer of the KK100 and SIS Building
 July 10 – Paul Andreu, French airport architect (died 2018)
 July 14 – Moshe Safdie, Israeli/Canadian architect, urban designer, educator, theorist and author
 September 3 – Richard MacCormac, British architect (died 2014)
 November 30 – Andrea Branzi, Italian architect and designer
 December 30 – Susan Maxman, née Abel, American architect

Deaths
 February 25 – W. D. Caröe, English-born ecclesiastical architect (born 1857)
 July 2 – John James Burnet, Scottish architect (born 1857)
 October 30 – Charles Klauder, American architect (born 1872)
 December 24 – Bruno Taut, German-born architect and urban planner (born 1880)
 December 25 – Theodor Fischer, German architect (born 1862)

References